PT3 or variant may refer to:
 temporary designation of minor planet 
 Consolidated PT-3, a 1930s USAAC primary trainer aircraft
 PT-3, a World War II US Navy PT-boat.
 Prison Tycoon 3: Lockdown (2007 videogame)
 PT3, a paratriathlon classification
 PT3 Pentaksiran Tingkatan Tiga (or Form Three Assessment) exam, successor of Malaysisan Penilaian Menengah Rendah

See also 
 Part three (disambiguation)